Cornusse is a commune in the Cher department in the Centre-Val de Loire region of France.

Geography
The river Airain forms all of the commune's eastern border.

Population

Sights
 The church of St. Martin, dating from the nineteenth century.
 A museum.
 The chateau, dating from the fifteenth century, now a medical institute.

See also
Communes of the Cher department

References

Bibliography
Françoise Gicquiaud Cornusse, un château, un village, dans l'histoire du Berry. The « Villa de Cornossa », The « Seigneurie de Cornusse » 404 pages, 85 illustrations. 

Communes of Cher (department)